Tape Head is the seventh studio album by heavy metal/hard rock trio King's X, released in 1998 via Metal Blade Records.

A music video was made for the song "Fade". "World" is a reworked song from the band's Sneak Preview demos. The controversial unreleased track "Quality Control" is included on the album, but has been re-titled to "Happy". The majority of the lyrics are now different, including the lack of profanity.

The album cover picture is that of Doug Pinnick wrapped in recording tape.

According to Pinnick, he brought the songs "Happy", "Cupid" and "Hate You", and Ty Tabor brought "Ocean" to the Tape Head recording sessions. All other songs were band created during the recording session.

The song "Walter Bela Farkas" was recorded live August 8, 1996 at the Tramps nightclub in New York City.

Track listing
All songs written by King's X.

Personnel
Doug Pinnick – bass, vocals
Ty Tabor – guitar, vocals
Jerry Gaskill – drums, vocals

Additional musicians
 Wally Farkas – vocals on "Walter Bela Farkas"

Production and design
 Mixed and mastered at Alien Beans by Ty Tabor
 Photography by Wanda Tabor
 Cover by Ty Tabor
 Design by Brian J Ames

References

External links
Official band website
Additional information about the album

King's X albums
1998 albums
Metal Blade Records albums